Luis Miguel "Luismi" Cruz Hernández (born 23 May 2001) is a Spanish professional footballer who plays as a winger for Barcelona Atlètic, on loan from Sevilla.

Club career
Born in El Puerto de Santa María, Cádiz, Andalusia, Cruz was a Sevilla FC youth graduate. On 1 November 2017, while still in the Juvenil squads, he made his senior debut with the C-team by playing the last eight minutes of a 1–4 Tercera División away loss against UB Lebrijana.

Cruz first appeared with the reserves on 26 August 2018, coming on as a half-time substitute for Diego García in a 0–1 home loss against UD Ibiza in the Segunda División B. On 13 December 2018, he signed his first professional contract with the Nervionenses, agreeing to a deal until 2025.

In July 2019, Cruz suffered an anterior cruciate ligament injury, being sidelined until the following February. He scored his first senior goal on 15 February 2020, netting the C's only in a 1–0 home win over CD Utrera.

After being a regular starter for the B-side, Cruz made his first-team debut on 15 December 2021, replacing Joan Jordán in the second half of a 1–1 away draw against CE Andratx, in the season's Copa del Rey; he also converted Sevilla's fourth penalty in the 6–5 shoot-out win. His professional – and La Liga – debut occurred the following 22 January, as he again replaced Jordán in a 2–2 home draw against RC Celta de Vigo.

In August 2022, Cruz joined Barcelona B on a season-long loan deal with an option to buy.

International career
After representing Spain at under-16 level in 2017, Cruz was called up to the under-20s in July 2019, but had to withdraw due to injury.

References

External links
 Sevilla FC profile
 
 
 

2001 births
Living people
People from El Puerto de Santa María
Sportspeople from the Province of Cádiz
Spanish footballers
Spain youth international footballers
Footballers from Andalusia
Association football wingers
La Liga players
Primera Federación players
Segunda División B players
Tercera División players
Sevilla FC C players
Sevilla Atlético players
Sevilla FC players
FC Barcelona Atlètic players